Welshpool Airport  (also known as Mid-Wales Airport) is located  south of Welshpool, Powys, Wales.

It has a CAA Ordinary Licence (Number P865) that allows flights for the public transport of passengers or for flying instruction as authorised by the licensee (Mid Wales Airport Limited). The aerodrome is licensed for night use.
The airport is open to the public, with pleasure flights and flying lessons available.

Welshpool airport is one of the bases used by the Wales Air Ambulance.

An air show is held in June each year.

History
Welshpool airport was founded by Bob Jones near the farm he owned. It began operations as a grass strip in 1990 and eventually expanded into a civil aviation aerodrome.

References

External links

Airports in Wales
Welshpool
Buildings and structures in Powys
Transport in Powys